Christopher (Chris) Dominic Sidoti (born 1951) is an Australian expert on international human rights law, a lawyer and advocate. He is a former Human Rights Commissioner, and a former commissioner of the Australian Law Reform Commission, and has held a range of other distinguished posts.

Career 

Chris Sidoti was the Foundation Secretary of the Human Rights and Equal Opportunity Commission (since renamed the Australian Human Rights Commission) in 1987. In November 2016, Sidoti gave a speech for the Commission reflecting on thirty years of achievements and lessons.

Between 1995 and 2000 Sidoti served as Australian Human Rights Commissioner, and between 1992 - 1995 was a commissioner of the Australian Law Reform Commission. Sidoti also played a role in the establishment of the Asia Pacific Forum of National Human Rights Institutions. In 2008, Sidoti was appointed to the position of chairman of the New South Wales Casino Control Authority and subsequently the Casino, Liquor and Gaming Authority. In 2007-2008, Chris Sidoti held the independent position of chair of the Northern Ireland Bill of Rights Forum.

He formerly held a position as National Secretary of the now dismantled Catholic Commission for Justice and Peace. Chris Sidoti was appointed to the board of trustees of the UN Voluntary Fund for Technical Cooperation in the Field of Human Rights in 2011.

In non-governmental roles, Sidoti served as Director of the International Service for Human Rights from 2003 to 2007 and later served on the board of the organization. He has also worked for the Human Rights Council of Australia and the Australian Catholic Commission for Justice and Peace. Sidoti is also a drafting committee member and signatory of the Yogyakarta Principles plus 10, on the application of international human rights law in relation to sexual orientation, gender identity, gender expression and sex characteristics.

Chris Sidoti also holds a number of academic positions. He serves as adjunct professor at the University of Western Sydney, Griffith University, University of the Sunshine Coast, and the Australian Catholic University. He is a Fellow of the Castan Centre for Human Rights Law at Monash University, and an Affiliate at the Sydney Centre for International Law at the University of Sydney.

References 

Living people
20th-century Australian lawyers
Human rights lawyers
Academic staff of Western Sydney University
1951 births
21st-century Australian lawyers